Spinnerette is the self-titled and only studio album by Spinnerette. It was released in the UK on June 15, 2009 through Anthem Records and in the US on June 23. On June 9, Spinnerette made the entire album available for listening on their MySpace page.

Track listing
"Ghetto Love" – 3:33
"All Babes Are Wolves" – 2:30
"Cupid" – 4:21
"Geeking" 4:13
"Baptized by Fire" – 4:35
"A Spectral Suspension" – 2:52
"Distorting a Code" – 4:06
"Sex Bomb" – 3:46
"Driving Song" – 4:30
"Rebellious Palpitations" – 2:40
"The Walking Dead" – 5:45
"Impaler" – 2:33
"A Prescription for Mankind" – 8:11

iTunes bonus track
"The Day My Baby Gave Me a Surprise (Devo cover)" – 2:45

Charts

References

2009 debut albums
Anthem Records albums
Spinnerette albums